Oregon Failure is a studio album by American rapper Sleep, a member of the Pacific Northwest hip hop collective Oldominion. It was released on Strange Famous Records in 2014. The album is entirely produced by Maulskull, and it features guest appearances from Ceschi, Onry Ozzborn, and Pigeon John, among others.

Music 
Oregon Failure is entirely produced by Seattle producer Maulskull, and it features guest appearances from Ceschi, Xperience, Tony Ozier, Onry Ozzborn, Nyqwil of Oldominion and Pigeon John.

Track listing

References

External links
 
 

2014 albums
Strange Famous Records albums
Sleep (rapper) albums